Edgewood Lake may refer to:

Lakes
Edgewood Lake (Alabama)
Edgewood Lake (Rhode Island)

Populated places
Edgewood Lake, Indiana, an unincorporated community in Putnam County